Rahul M. Jindal (born June 16, 1955) is an Indian–American transplant surgeon, professor, humanitarian and author. In 2008, he set up a renal replacement therapy program which led to the only comprehensive kidney transplant and dialysis program in Guyana. As of 2019, he is a professor in the Department of Surgery at Uniformed Services University, Bethesda, Maryland.  Since 2008, he has been an attending transplant surgeon at Walter Reed National Military Medical Center where he performs kidney transplants and mentors senior-level students and residents in surgical sciences and global health. Since 2005, he has been a Commissioner at the Montgomery County Office of Human Rights, Maryland. He also serves as Commissioner for the Governor's Office on Service and Volunteerism in Maryland. Jindal is also an adjunct Professor of Global Health at the Indian Institute of Public Health, Gandhinagar.

History

Jindal was born in New Delhi, India to a physician father and homemaker mother. He obtained five degrees, including one from Wolfson College, Oxford, and the Royal College of Surgeons of Edinburgh, fellowship of the American College of Surgeons and a PhD from Middlesex University located in the UK. Afterward he moved to the United States to pursue his medical career and in 2006 he became a naturalized citizen of the United States. Later he became the first person to perform a kidney transplant in Guyana. Jindal and his medical team performed the first ever pancreas islet cell transplant after trauma. In 2015, Jindal's team added a corneal transplant program to their existing work in Guyana.

Awards and honors

In 2013, Jindal was awarded Outstanding American by Choice by the United States Citizenship and Immigration Services. In 2013, Jindal was given an award of Excellence for his humanitarian mission in Guyana by the Guyana's president. He was also awarded for Excellence in Community Service by International Leadership Foundation (Washington, DC).

In 2015, he was awarded the Ellis Island Medal of Honor. From 2015 to 2016 Jindal was appointed Fulbright-Nehru Distinguished Chair to India.

In 2018, Jindal was awarded Faculty Mentor of the Year by the Alpha Omega Alpha Uniformed Services University Chapter.

In 2019, Jindal was named one of 36 Great Immigrants, chosen from all walks of life by the Carnegie Corporation of New York.

Books

 Managing Seva (selfless service) in Times of Great Change, (2015)
 The Story of First Kidney Transplant in Guyana, South America, and Lessons Learnt for Other Developing Countries, (2009)
 The Struggle for life: A psychological perspective of kidney disease and transplantation, by LS Baines and RM Jindal, (Praeger Series in Health Psychology, 2003 )

Publications
Jindal has been involved in over 200 peer reviewed publications since 1992. Publications include JAMA Surgery, Gastroenterology, Hepatology, Urology, Transplantation, and Diabetes.

References 

1955 births
Fulbright Distinguished Chairs
Living people
Indian transplant surgeons
Indian humanitarians
American transplant surgeons
Fulbright alumni